Rose Hill is a city in Mahaska County, Iowa, United States. The population was 157 at the time of the 2020 census.

Geography

Demographics

2010 census
As of the census of 2010, there were 168 people, 72 households, and 47 families living in the city. The racial makeup of the city was 98.2% White, 0.6% Asian, and 1.2% from two or more races.

There were 72 households, of which 27.8% had children under the age of 18 living with them, 51.4% were married couples living together, 9.7% had a female householder with no husband present, 4.2% had a male householder with no wife present, and 34.7% were non-families. 23.6% of all households were made up of individuals, and 1.4% had someone living alone who was 65 years of age or older. The average household size was 2.33 and the average family size was 2.70.

The median age in the city was 42.4 years. 21.4% of residents were under the age of 18; 6.6% were between the ages of 18 and 24; 25% were from 25 to 44; 35.7% were from 45 to 64; and 11.3% were 65 years of age or older. The gender makeup of the city was 54.2% male and 45.8% female.

2000 census
As of the census of 2000, there were 205 people, 82 households, and 56 families living in the city. The racial makeup of the city was 96.10% White, 0.49% Native American, 0.49% from other races, and 2.93% from two or more races. Hispanic or Latino of any race were 1.95% of the population.

There were 82 households, out of which 32.9% had children under the age of 18 living with them, 52.4% were married couples living together, 9.8% had a female householder with no husband present, and 31.7% were non-families. 25.6% of all households were made up of individuals, and 3.7% had someone living alone who was 65 years of age or older. The average household size was 2.50 and the average family size was 3.00.

In the city, the population was spread out, with 26.3% under the age of 18, 9.8% from 18 to 24, 34.6% from 25 to 44, 19.5% from 45 to 64, and 9.8% who were 65 years of age or older. The median age was 34 years. For every 100 females, there were 111.3 males. For every 100 females age 18 and over, there were 104.1 males.

The median income for a household in the city was $30,469, and the median income for a family was $32,143. Males had a median income of $30,357 versus $18,125 for females. The per capita income for the city was $21,298. About 16.0% of families and 14.0% of the population were below the poverty line, including 6.5% of those under the age of eighteen and 17.2% of those 65 or over.

See also
Rose Hill Methodist Episcopal Church, listed on the National Register of Historic Places

References

Cities in Mahaska County, Iowa
Cities in Iowa